FYVE, RhoGEF and PH domain-containing protein 2 (FGD2), also known as zinc finger FYVE domain-containing protein 4 (ZFYVE4), is a protein that in humans is encoded by the FGD2 gene.

It is a member of the FYVE, RhoGEF and PH domain containing family.

References

Further reading